James Johnstone Rogerson (March 21, 1820 – October 17, 1907) was a businessman, political figure and philanthropist in Newfoundland. He represented Burin from 1859 to 1861 and Bay de Verde from 1870 to 1882 in the Newfoundland and Labrador House of Assembly.

He was born in Harbour Grace, the son of Peter Rogerson and Amelia Palmer. He apprenticed with a Scottish firm based in St. John's before joining his father's firm, which was involved in shipping goods and the seal fishery, in 1841. He was named to the Legislative Council in 1850 and to the Executive Council in 1858. He did not run for reelection in 1861 but was elected again in an 1870 by-election held after John Bemister resigned to accept a position as sheriff. Rogerson served as receiver general from 1874 to 1882. He was defeated when he ran for reelection in 1882. After he retired from politics, he was active in the Temperance Society. Rogerson established a home for fishermen and sailors and an agency to find employment for workers in winter. He also supported the education of poor children and juveniles in prison, and literacy programs for people living in remote locations on the island. Rogerson was married twice: to Emma Garrett Blaikie in 1845 and to Isabella Whiteford in 1879. He died in St. John's at the age of 87.

His daughter Jessie Emma married A.J.W. McNeilly who also served in the Newfoundland assembly.

References 

Members of the Newfoundland and Labrador House of Assembly
Members of the Legislative Council of Newfoundland
1820 births
1907 deaths
Newfoundland Colony people
19th-century Canadian philanthropists